Andecaliximab (INN; development code GS-5745) is an experimental humanized monoclonal antibody designed for the treatment of cancer and inflammatory diseases.

This drug was developed by Gilead Sciences, Inc.

Phase II and phase III trials for gastric cancer or gastroesophageal junction adenocarcinoma completed in 2019.

References 

Monoclonal antibodies